Wachowiak is a surname of Polish-language origin. It may refer to:
 Friedrich Wachowiak (1920–1944), German Luftwaffe fighter ace
 Jutta Wachowiak (born 1940), German actress

References

See also
 

Polish-language surnames